Krasnopartizansky (masculine), Krasnopartizanskaya (feminine), or Krasnopartizanskoye (neuter) is the name of several rural localities in Russia:
Krasnopartizansky, Chechen Republic, a settlement in Alkhan-Yurtovskaya Rural Administration of Urus-Martanovsky District of the Chechen Republic
Krasnopartizansky, Rostov Oblast, a settlement in Krasnopartizanskoye Rural Settlement of Remontnensky District of Rostov Oblast
Krasnopartizansky, Ryazan Oblast, a settlement in Vysokopolyansky Rural Okrug of Pitelinsky District of Ryazan Oblast
Krasnopartizansky, Volgograd Oblast, a settlement in Privolzhsky Selsoviet of Svetloyarsky District of Volgograd Oblast
Krasnopartizanskoye, a selo in Pavlovsky Stanitsa Okrug of Pavlovsky District of Krasnodar Krai